The Moore 24 is an American trailerable sailboat that was designed by George Olson and Ron Moore as a racer and first built in 1972.

Production
The design is built by Moore Sailboats in the United States. The company built 156 boats between 1972 and 1988, with two more in more recent years, for a total of 158. The design remains in production.

Design
The Moore 24 is a development of Grendal, a prototype sailboat that was intended for a Transpacific Yacht Race for boats under  in length. That race was never held, but Grendal went on to win the 1970 Midget Ocean Racing Class (MORC) championships. The Moore 24 also received a raised deck to increase headroom below, a relocated keel and a new sail plan. Development has continued though the production period of the boat and production boats in 2021 were all flush-decked, with open transoms, while remaining class-legal.

The Moore 24 is a racing keelboat, built predominantly of fiberglass, with wood trim. It has a fractional sloop rig, a raked stem, a reverse transom, an internally mounted spade-type rudder controlled by a tiller and a fixed fin keel. It displaces  and carries  of ballast, giving it a high ballast-displacement of 48.78%.

It is normally fitted with a small  outboard motor for docking and maneuvering. It has sleeping accommodation for two people.

The design has a PHRF racing average handicap of 156 according to The Sailor's Book of Small Cruising Sailboats and 150 according to the Yacht Racing Association of San Francisco Bay.

Operational history
The boat is supported by an active class club that organizes racing events, the Moore 24 National Association.

In a 2010 review Steve Henkel wrote, "best features: She's fast in heavy air; the high (50%) B/D ratio helps to keep the Moore 24 on her feet. Worst features: Due to her light weight and cramped cabin space, almost no one would want to buy this design as a cruising boat."

Serial circumnavigator Webb Chiles sailed his Moore 24, Gannet, solo around the world from 2014-2019, departing and arriving San Diego, California.

In 2016 the Moore 24 Mas! won the Pacific Cup overall, double handed, crewed by Mark English and Ian Rogers. The two set a new course record for the Moore 24 of 10 days 14 hours and 30 minutes with a 240 mile best 24 hour run.

See also
List of sailing boat types

References

External links

Video - Surfing a Moore 24
Video - Tour of a Moore 24

Keelboats
1970s sailboat type designs
Sailing yachts
Trailer sailers
Sailboat type designs by George Olson
Sailboat type designs by Ron Moore
Sailboat types built by Moore Sailboats